Stephanie Moyer (born September 24, 1997) is an American professional stock car racing driver. She currently competes full-time in the ARCA Menards Series East and part-time in the ARCA Menards Series, driving the No. 01 for Fast Track Racing.

Racing career

Early years 
Moyer would first race in Champ Cars at the age of 12. In 2012, she would move up to the Factory Stock division at Evergreen Raceway, and raced there for nine years before eventually winning the championship in 2020.

ARCA Menards Series 
Moyer would make her first start in the ARCA Menards Series at the 2021 General Tire #AnywhereIsPossible 200, finishing 15th. She would make three more starts in series combination events, retiring from two events and finishing 20th in Milwaukee.

ARCA Menards Series East 
Moyer would get her first chance at ARCA, after her fiance's boss, Johnny Davis, recommended Moyer to Fast Track Racing owner Andy Hillenburg. Moyer would make her debut with Fast Track Racing at the 2021 Pensacola 200, finishing a respectable eighth, earning her first top 10. Afterwards, she would get another top 10 at the 2021 Crosley Record Pressing 200, but, the season would take a downturn for her afterwards, retiring for the rest of the races (with the exception of the 2021 Sprecher 150), finishing last once at Iowa.

On December 22, 2021, it was announced that she would run the full season in the No. 01 for Fast Track Racing in 2022 after driving the majority of the 2021 season for the team.

Modifieds 
Moyer would make her debut in asphalt modifieds at Mahoning Valley Speedway on July 31, 2021 at the 2021 Morin Arthofer Sr. Tribute.

Personal life 
Moyer had a brother, Michael, who died in 2011 in a car accident. She is a second-generation racer, following in her father's and uncle's footsteps. She is not related to Floridian ARCA driver A. J. Moyer.

Motorsports career results

ARCA Menards Series 
(key) (Bold – Pole position awarded by qualifying time. Italics – Pole position earned by points standings or practice time. * – Most laps led.)

ARCA Menards Series East

References

External links 
 Stephanie Moyer driver statistics at Racing-Reference
 Official website

1997 births
Living people
ARCA Menards Series drivers
NASCAR drivers
Racing drivers from Pennsylvania
People from Schuylkill County, Pennsylvania